EV/GCI (enterprise value/gross cash invested) is an advanced valuation multiple used to compare a company's book value of its assets to their current market value. The ratio is similar to P/B  ratio, but EV/GCI is calculated on an EV-basis, taking into account all the company's security-holders.

Formula

When EV/GCI is higher than 1, then the market is willing to pay a valuation premium. A discount takes place in the opposite case.

References

External links
COMPANY UPDATE Ericsson (ERICb.ST)
COMPANY UPDATE Benetton Group (BNG.MI)

Financial ratios